Alessandro Birindelli (born 12 November 1974) is an Italian retired footballer who played as a full-back or as a wide midfielder. Equally at ease on both the left and the right flanks, he was best known for his 11-year spell with Juventus, during which time he won several accolades and appeared in nearly 300 official games.

Club career

Early years
Born to Paolo and Erminia Birindelli in Pisa as the second of two children, Birindelli started playing football at the age of eight for the local team of San Frediano (an area of Pisa not far from his boyhood home and the church of the same name).

A longtime Juventus F.C. fan, being an admirer of Michel Platini, he was also influenced by Paolo Maldini's professionalism and sportsmanship, and entered Empoli FC's youth academy, beginning his career as a right winger before moving into defence. In 1996, he won the Coppa Italia Serie C, as the team finished second in its group in Serie C1, thus earning Serie B promotion; Empoli followed this with another climb, now to Serie A, after collecting 64 points which trailed only Brescia Calcio's 66.

Juventus
After nearly 150 official matches, Birindelli ended his career with Empoli and moved to Juventus in 1997, managed at the time by Marcello Lippi, joining an already strong squad – which featured young prodigies Alessandro Del Piero and Zinedine Zidane – and arriving alongside Edgar Davids and Filippo Inzaghi. He made his league debut in a 2–0 victory over U.S. Lecce on 31 August, but his first competitive appearance had taken place in the Supercoppa Italiana defeat of Vicenza Calcio.

In his first season Birindelli won the Scudetto over Inter Milan, by five points. He was an unused substitute as the club lost the UEFA Champions League for the second consecutive time, now to Real Madrid.

Birindelli won two more leagues with Juventus, in 2002 and 2003, adding two Italian Supercups and also reaching two Coppa Italia finals. Again, he was a part of the side which lost in a Champions League final, this time in the 2002–03 edition against A.C. Milan on penalties which was the first all-Italian final in the history of the competition, being one of only team players to convert his attempt in an eventual 2–3 defeat.

In the summer of 2005, while playing a friendly against S.L. Benfica, Birindelli injured his ankle and missed the entire campaign. Due to the Turin club's involvement in the 2006 Italian football scandal, it was stripped of its 2005 and 2006 titles, and also relegated to the second division.

Birindelli and Juventus initially started 2006–07 with a 30-point deduction as a further punishment for their role in the match-fixing scandal, but it was ultimately reduced to nine, which allowed for another Cadetti conquest for the player and the subsequent promotion. He contributed with 37 league appearances to this feat, while also becoming vice-captain.

Claudio Ranieri took over as coach for the 2007–08 season, and Birindelli only played seven times in the league. On 17 May 2008 he left the club after 11 years, claiming that he wished to continue playing for another year or two.

Late career
On 22 July 2008, Birindelli was announced as Pisa Calcio's new signing, thus finally giving him the opportunity to play for his hometown side. However, the team suffered relegation from the second tier at the end of the campaign, and then excluded from Italian football due to financial issues.

In August 2009, Birindelli signed a two-year contract with lowly A.S. Pescina Valle del Giovenco. He found himself a free agent in June 2010, after the club was excluded from football due to heavy debts.

On 19 September 2011, Birindelli was appointed head coach at U.S. Pistoiese 1921 in Serie D, leaving his post the following month.

International career
Birindelli represented Italy's under-17s at the 1991 FIFA World Championship, but did not start in any of the team's three games. His first start in a national jersey was as part of the Marco Tardelli-led under-23 squad that competed in the 1997 Mediterranean Games, held in Bari: the nation went on to win the gold medal, with him featuring in three of the four matches including the final against Turkey.

Birindelli's full debut came with Giovanni Trapattoni on 20 November 2002, a 1–1 friendly draw with Turkey. He went on to gain a further five caps in nearly two years, the last being the 0–2 loss in Iceland, and was not summoned for UEFA Euro 2004.

In July 2010 Birindelli retired from active football, immediately being named assistant coach in the Zambian national team led by countryman Dario Bonetti. He resigned from his position in February 2011, due to misunderstandings.

Style of play
Birindelli was a hard-working, tenacious, and versatile player, who was capable of playing as a full-back or wide midfielder on either flank, although he often played on the right side of the pitch. He was mainly known for his speed, stamina, and consistency, as well as his sportsmanship, which enabled him to cover the flank effectively.

Personal life
Birindelli married childhood sweetheart Silvia, with whom he had two children, Samuele and Matteo. Samuele Birindelli made his professional debut as a defender for Pisa in December 2016.

Club statistics

Honours

Club
Empoli
Coppa Italia Lega Pro: 1995–96

Juventus
Serie A: 1997–98, 2001–02, 2002–03
Supercoppa Italiana: 1997, 2002, 2003; Runner-up 1998, 2005
UEFA Intertoto Cup: 1999
Serie B: 2006–07
Coppa Italia: Runner-up 2001–02, 2003–04
UEFA Champions League: Runner-up 1997–98, 2002–03

International
Italy U-23
Mediterranean Games: 1997

References

External links

National team data  

1974 births
Living people
Sportspeople from Pisa
Italian footballers
Association football defenders
Serie A players
Serie B players
Serie C players
Empoli F.C. players
Juventus F.C. players
Pisa S.C. players
Italy international footballers
Italian football managers
U.S. Pistoiese 1921 managers
Mediterranean Games gold medalists for Italy
Mediterranean Games medalists in football
Competitors at the 1997 Mediterranean Games
Footballers from Tuscany